"King Kunta" is a song by American hip hop recording artist Kendrick Lamar, taken from his third album, To Pimp a Butterfly (2015).  It was released as the album's third single on March 24, 2015. Lamar co-wrote the song with Thundercat, while Terrace Martin, Michael Kuhle, and Sounwave served as producers. The song features interpolations and references to lyrics written by Michael Jackson, James Brown, Fred Wesley, John Starks, Ahmad, Redfoo, and Johnny Burns, who are all credited as songwriters.

Writing and composition
"King Kunta" is a reference to the archetypal rebellious slave Kunta Kinte, the basis of the main character from the Alex Haley novel, Roots: The Saga of an American Family. The song also contains references to Chinua Achebe's novel Things Fall Apart and Ralph Ellison’s novel Invisible Man. The song contains an interpolation of "Get Nekkid" (2000), written by Johnny Burns (a.k.a. Mausberg), performed by Mausberg, and produced by DJ Quik; resung lyrics from "Smooth Criminal" (1987), written and performed by Michael Jackson; elements of the 1974 James Brown song "The Payback", written by Brown, Fred Wesley, and John Starks; and a sample from the 1994 song "We Want the Funk", written and performed by Ahmad Lewis. Background vocals are provided by Whitney Alford.

Critical reception
"King Kunta" was placed at number seven on Rolling Stone'''s "50 Best Songs of 2015" list, with the editors commenting, "The fiercest and most funkadelic track on To Pimp a Butterfly takes aim at everything from Lamar's haters to "the power that be." We already knew Kendrick was a great lyricist; turns out he's kind of a badass, too." Additionally, Pitchfork ranked the song at number four on its "The 100 Best Tracks of 2015" list. Village Voice named "King Kunta" the second-best single released in 2015 on their annual year-end critics' poll, Pazz & Jop. It came in 2nd on the annual Triple J Hottest 100 for 2015.

Music video
The song's music video was filmed in Compton, California. Lamar stated in an interview with New York City radio station Hot 97 that the majority of the people in the video are friends of his who still reside in Compton. The video was directed by Director X, who explained to Complex'' that the visual to "King Kunta" was originally inspired by "Still D.R.E.", a classic in the West Coast video canon. "King Kunta" also borrows ideas from 2Pac and Dr. Dre's "California Love" video. In the beginning of "California Love", 'Pac goes to the Compton Swap Meet to look for some clothes to wear to the party later that night.' In "King Kunta", Lamar gets on top of the Swap Meet and raps to an adoring crowd below. Wal-Mart has officially purchased the Swap Meet, so the video is both Lamar's shout-out to 'Pac & Dre and a "goodbye party" to the Compton institution. The video premiered on Vevo and YouTube on April 1, 2015.

Live performances
Lamar has performed "King Kunta" on the Damn tour.

Charts

Weekly charts

Year-end charts

Certifications

References

2015 singles
Kendrick Lamar songs
2015 songs
Songs written by Redfoo
Songs written by Michael Jackson
Songs written by Kendrick Lamar
Top Dawg Entertainment singles
G-funk songs
Songs written by Thundercat (musician)
Music videos directed by Director X
Roots: The Saga of an American Family